The slender duneslider (Lerista vermicularis) is a species of skink found in Western Australia.

References

Lerista
Reptiles described in 1982
Taxa named by Glen Milton Storr